Henttaa is a district of Espoo, a city in Finland.

See also 
 Districts of Espoo

External links 

Districts of Espoo